The Santa Ana Valley is located in Orange County, California and is bisected by the Santa Ana River. The valley is home to most of Orange County's central business districts. The cities of Anaheim, Buena Park, Costa Mesa, Fullerton, Irvine, Orange, Placentia, Santa Ana, and Yorba Linda are located in the Santa Ana Valley.

History
This valley was named Vallejo de Santa Ana in 1769 after the Gaspar de Portolà expedition, of which Friar Junípero Serra was a part, as well as Sargeant José Antonio Yorba, and José Manuel Nieto. The mission located closest to the Santa Ana Valley is Mission San Juan Capistrano, which was built east of the San Joaquin Hills, in the present day city of San Juan Capistrano.

Ranchos
The historic Ranchos of California in the Santa Ana Valley area:
Rancho Santiago de Santa Ana
Rancho San Joaquin
Rancho Lomas de Santiago
Rancho San Juan Cajón de Santa Ana

See also
Category: Ranchos of Orange County, California
List of Ranchos of California

Valleys of California
Valleys of Orange County, California
Santa Ana River
Geography of Anaheim, California
Costa Mesa, California
Geography of Fullerton, California
Geography of Irvine, California
Geography of Orange, California
Geography of Santa Ana, California